L, or l or ℓ in cursive, is the twelfth letter in the Latin alphabet, used in the modern English alphabet, the alphabets of other western European languages and others worldwide. Its name in English is el (pronounced ), plural els.

History

Lamedh may have come from a pictogram of an ox goad or cattle prod. Some have  suggested a shepherd's staff.

Use in writing systems

Phonetic and phonemic transcription
In phonetic and phonemic transcription, the International Phonetic Alphabet uses  to represent the lateral alveolar approximant.

English
In English orthography,  usually represents the phoneme , which can have several sound values, depending on the speaker's accent, and whether it occurs before or after a vowel. The alveolar lateral approximant (the sound represented in IPA by lowercase ) occurs before a vowel, as in lip or blend, while the velarized alveolar lateral approximant (IPA ) occurs in bell and milk. This velarization does not occur in many European languages that use ; it is also a factor making the pronunciation of  difficult for users of languages that lack  or have different values for it, such as Japanese or some southern dialects of Chinese.

In English orthography,  is often silent in such words as walk or could (though its presence can modify the preceding vowel letter's value), and it is usually silent in such words as palm and psalm; however, there is some regional variation.

Other languages
 usually represents the sound  or some other lateral consonant.

In Spanish,  represents [ʎ], [j], [ʝ], [ɟʝ], or [ʃ], depending on dialect.

In Washo, lower-case  represents a typical [l] sound, while upper-case  represents a voiceless [l̥] sound, a bit like double  in Welsh.

Other uses
The capital letter L is used as the currency sign for the Albanian lek and the Honduran lempira. It was often used, especially in handwriting, as the currency sign for the Italian lira. It is also infrequently used as a substitute for the pound sign (£), which is based on it.

The Roman numeral L represents the number 50.

In recent years, the letters L and W have become an internet meme, respectively standing for loss and win. L, in particular, is commonly used in popular culture, often referring to the slang definition of ownership. Take the L, respectively, means to accept this particular defeat.

Forms and variants

In most sans-serif typefaces, the lowercase letter ell , written , may be difficult to distinguish from the uppercase letter "eye" ; in some serif typefaces, the glyph  may be confused with the glyph , the digit one. To avoid such confusion, some newer computer fonts (such as Trebuchet MS) have a finial, a curve to the right at the bottom of the lowercase letter ell.

Another means of reducing such confusion used in mathematics, European road signs and in advertisements is to use symbol , which is a cursive, handwriting-style lowercase form of the letter "ell". In Japan, for example, this is the symbol for the liter.

Related characters

Descendants and related characters in the Latin alphabet
IPA-specific symbols related to L:        
IPA superscript symbols related to L: 𐞛 𐞜
Extensions to IPA for disordered speech (extIPA): 𝼄 𐞝
Uralic Phonetic Alphabet-specific symbols related to L:  and 
ₗ : Subscript small l was used in the Uralic Phonetic Alphabet prior to its formal standardization in 1902
ȴ : L with curl is used in Sino-Tibetanist linguistics
Ꞁ ꞁ : Turned L was used by William Pryce to designate the Welsh voiced lateral spirant [ɬ] It is also used in the Romic alphabet.
𝼦 : Small letter l with mid-height left hook was used by the British and Foreign Bible Society in the early 20th century for romanization of the Malayalam language.
Other variations are used for phonetic transcription: ᶅ ᶩ ᶪ ᶫ 𝼑 𝼓
Ꝇ ꝇ : Broken L was used in some medieval Nordic manuscripts
Teuthonista phonetic transcription-specific symbols related to R:

L with diacritics: Ĺ ĺ Ł ł Ľ ľ Ḹ ḹ L̃ l̃ Ļ ļ Ŀ ŀ Ḷ ḷ Ḻ ḻ Ḽ ḽ Ƚ ƚ Ⱡ ⱡ ʹL ʹl

Derived signs, symbols and abbreviations
ℒ ℓ : Script letter L (capital and lowercase, respectively)
£ : pound sign
₤ : lira sign
Ꝉ ꝉ : Forms of L were used for medieval scribal abbreviations

Ancestors and siblings in other alphabets
 : Semitic letter Lamedh, from which the following symbols originally derive
Λ λ : Greek letter Lambda, from which the following letters derive
Л л : Cyrillic letter El
Ⲗⲗ : Coptic letter Lamda
𐌋 : Old Italic letter L, which is the ancestor of modern Latin L
ᛚ : Runic letter laguz, which might derive from old Italic L
𐌻 : Gothic letter laaz

Computing codes

 1

Other representations

References

External links

ISO basic Latin letters